Frederick Archibald Fowlie (May 9, 1866 – June 8, 1963) was a Canadian politician. He served in the Legislative Assembly of New Brunswick from 1921 to 1925 as an independent member. He died in 1963, aged 97.

References 

1866 births
1963 deaths